Lou Kindt (born ) is a Belgian male volleyball player. He is part of the Belgium men's national volleyball team. He competed at the 2015 European Games in Baku. On club level he plays for Volley Menen.

References

1997 births
Living people
Belgian men's volleyball players
Volleyball players at the 2015 European Games
European Games competitors for Belgium
Place of birth missing (living people)